The 2022 Meerbusch Challenger was a professional tennis tournament played on clay courts. It was the ninth edition of the tournament which was part of the 2022 ATP Challenger Tour. It took place in Meerbusch, Germany, between 8 and 14 August 2022.

Singles main draw entrants

Seeds

 1 Rankings as of 1 August 2022.

Other entrants
The following players received wildcards into the singles main draw:
  Kimmer Coppejans
  Rudolf Molleker
  Marko Topo

The following player received entry into the singles main draw using a protected ranking:
  Sumit Nagal

The following players received entry into the singles main draw as alternates:
  Dan Added
  Vitaliy Sachko
  Henri Squire

The following players received entry from the qualifying draw:
  Adrian Andreev
  Lucas Gerch
  Carlos López Montagud
  Max Hans Rehberg
  Clément Tabur
  Alexey Vatutin

The following player received entry as a lucky loser:
  Nikola Milojević

Champions

Singles 

  Bernabé Zapata Miralles def.  Dennis Novak 6–1, 6–2.

Doubles 

  David Pel /  Szymon Walków def.  Neil Oberleitner /  Philipp Oswald 7–5, 6–1.

References

Meerbusch Challenger
2022
Meerbusch Challenger
August 2022 sports events in Germany